John Kristen Skogan (born 1942) is a Norwegian political scientist and politician for the Conservative Party.

He graduated from the University of Oslo with the mag.art. degree (PhD equivalent) in 1971. He was a research assistant at the Norwegian Defence Research Establishment from 1967 to 1968 and a research associate at the International Institute for Strategic Studies from 1974 to 1975. Since 1970 he has worked as a researcher at the Norwegian Institute of International Affairs.

From 1989 to 1990, when the cabinet Syse held office, Skogan was appointed State Secretary in the Ministry of Defence.

External links
 John K.Skogan on NUPI's website.

1942 births
Living people
Deputy members of the Storting
Conservative Party (Norway) politicians
Norwegian state secretaries
Norwegian political scientists
University of Oslo alumni